Ghost Game is a comedy-horror film directed by Joe Knee and stars Alexandra Barreto, Shelby Fenner and Erik Woods.

Plot
It should be a relaxing weekend in a remote cabin in the woods, as far away from big city bustle and the usual routine. But for the group of young people who wanted to meet here for camping, there is different. When they find a mysterious game and play it despite every warning, they unknowingly invoke three hideous ghosts; witches who only have one thing in mind: the death of the group. Only when it is possible to solve the various mysteries in time, can they hope to escape the clutches of the evil they have awoken and, for the parties, it's a merciless race of death against life.

Cast
 Alexandra Barreto as Dara
 Shelby Fenner as Abbey
 Curt Cornelius as Rand
 Aaron Patrick Freeman as Sebastian
 Robert Berson as Cousin Ted
 Danielle Hartnett as Talia
 Peter Cilella as Nate
 Erik Woods as Simon Brady
 Caroline D'Amore as Rachel
 Sahra Silanee	as Lucy
 Sarah Shoup as Jessi
 Jamie Alexander as Sportscaster

Release
The film premiered on 15 November 2004 in Los Angeles, California, and was released on DVD in Germany on 7 September 2006 as part of the Constantin Film series Horror Hoch Drei alongside The Dark and The Cave.

References

External links
 
 Official Site
 Official Constantin Site

2004 films
American mystery films
American comedy horror films
American ghost films
2004 science fiction films
2000s comedy horror films
2004 comedy films
2000s English-language films
2000s American films